Dmitry Lisov (born 23 October 1990) is a Russian sledge hockey player who won a silver medal at the 2014 Winter Paralympics in Sochi, Russia. Prior to it he participated at the 2013 IPC Ice Sledge Hockey World Championships where his team got a bronze medal.

References

External links 
 

1990 births
Living people
Russian sledge hockey players
Paralympic sledge hockey players of Russia
Paralympic silver medalists for Russia
Ice sledge hockey players at the 2014 Winter Paralympics
Medalists at the 2014 Winter Paralympics
Paralympic medalists in sledge hockey
21st-century Russian people